Khanaq may refer to:
Khanaq, alternate name of Khunik-e Pay Godar
Khanaq-e Bala
Khanaq-e Pain